TAF Preventive Medicine Bulletin is a bimonthly peer-reviewed medical journal covering primary medical services and preventive medicine. It was established in 2001. From 2011 to 2016 it was abstracted and indexed in Scopus.

References

Publications established in 2001
Preventive medicine journals
Multilingual journals
Bimonthly journals